Rovato is a comune in the province of Brescia, in Lombardy, northern Italy. Neighbouring towns are Coccaglio, Erbusco and Cazzago San Martino.  It is located in the Franciacorta hills, 11 km south of Lake Iseo and 18 km west of Brescia.

Transport
 Rovato railway station
 Rovato Borgo railway station
 Rovato Città railway station

References

External links
Rovato Online Encyclopedic Resource

Cities and towns in Lombardy